This is a list of finalists for the 2001 Archibald Prize for portraiture (listed is Artist – Title).

Finalists
    Bruce Armstrong – Peter Carey in Kelly country
    Michael Bell – Kingo and Boofhead, Lavendar Bay
    Danelle Bergstrom – The portrait and the painter (John Firth-Smith)
    David Bromley – Long Tom
 Tom Carment – John Gaden – summer portrait
    Brendon Ross Darby – Ian Parmenter
    Julie Dowling – Sister girl – Carol Dowling
    Geoffrey Dyer – The director John Clark
    Martine Emdur – Laughing on the inside – (Peter Berner)
    Paul Fairweather – Exhibitors of exuberance, Mostyn Bramley-Moore: a tribute to Michael Milburn
    Margarita Georgiadis – Excelle – Libbi Gorr
    Guo Hua Cai – Lee Lin Chin
    Robert Hannaford – Richard Maurovic
 Nicholas Harding – John Bell as King Lear (Winner: Archibald Prize 2001)
    Cherry Hood – Matthys
    Bill Leak – Robert Hughes – nothing if not critical
 Kerrie Lester – Contemplating the emperor's new clothes – (Akira Isogawa)
    Mathew Lynn – Hetti Perkins
    Lewis Miller – Self portrait
    Henry Mulholland – Michael Snape
    David Naseby – A blackguard rehearsing – Max Cullen
    Paul Newton – Roy and HG (John Doyle and Greig Pickhaver) (Winner: People's Choice 2001)
 Rodney Pople – Head study – Richard Goodwin
Sally Robinson – Antony Walker
 Jenny Sages – Jackie and Kerryn
    Michael Snape – Paul Hopmeier and Ron Robertson-Swann
    Kim Spooner – and see the light surrounding you (Daniel Johns)
 Branca Uzur – Tetsuya Wakuda
    John R Walker – Portrait of Tony Bilson
    Greg Warburton – The Public Defender – portrait of John Nicholson S.C.
 Dick Watkins – Adam Cullen

See also
Previous year: List of Archibald Prize 2000 finalists
Next year: List of Archibald Prize 2002 finalists
List of Archibald Prize winners

External links
Archibald Prize 2001 finalists official website

2001
Archibald Prize 2001
Archibald Prize 2001
Archibald
Arch
Archibald
Archibald